No. 10 is the tenth studio album by Serbian singer Dragana Mirković. It was released in 1993.

Track listing
Do poslednjeg daha (To the last breath)
Pitam svoje srce (I ask my heart)
Baš tebe volim ja (You're the one I love)
Mnogo sam te poželela (I've missed you so much)
Biću njegova (I'll be his)
Zaboravi srce (Heart, forget)
Vetrovi tuge (Sad winds)
Kad za tobom umrem ja (While I'm dying for you)
Halo dragi (Hello baby)
Tebi ljubav meni bol (You get the love, I get the pain)
Ljubav kad je prava (Love when done right)
Ne pada mi na pamet (No way)

References

1993 albums
Dragana Mirković albums